Manuel Fernández Mármol (3 June 1912 – 20 January 1983) was a politician from the Dominican Republic who served as Vice president of the Dominican Republic and Mayor of Santo Domingo.

Personal life 
On 20 January 1983, he died of pneumonia at the age of 70. He was a founding member of the Dominican Revolutionary Party.

References 

1983 deaths
Dominican Revolutionary Party politicians
Vice presidents of the Dominican Republic
1912 births
20th-century Dominican Republic politicians
Deaths from pneumonia in the Dominican Republic
Mayors of places in the Dominican Republic